Seiffert is a surname. Notable people with the surname include:

 Chase Seiffert (born 1991), American professional golfer
 Günther Seiffert (1937–2020), German racing driver
 John Seiffert (1905–1965), Australian politician
 Kurt Seiffert (born 1935), American Olympic champion rower
 Lisa Seiffert, on the List of Playboy Playmates of 2012
 Marjorie Allen Seiffert (1885–1970), American poet
 Max Seiffert (1868–1948), German musicologist
 Peter Seiffert (born 1954), German tenor
 Rachel Seiffert (born 1971), British novelist

See also
 Josepha Seyffert, better known as Josepha von Heydeck
 Seifert, a surname
 Seyfert (disambiguation)
 Siefert, a surname

Surnames from given names